Chulpan (Russian: Чулпан) means morning star (i.e. Venus) in Tatar language and may refer to:

Rural localities in Russia
Chulpan 2-y, Republic of Bashkortostan
Kyzyl-Chulpan, Republic of Bashkortostan
Chulpan, Bizhbulyaksky District, Republic of Bashkortostan
Chulpan, Buzdyaksky District, Republic of Bashkortostan
Chulpan, Miyakinsky District, Republic of Bashkortostan
Chulpan, Salavatsky District, Republic of Bashkortostan
Chulpan, Sterlitamaksky District, Republic of Bashkortostan
Chulpan, Tolbazinsky Selsoviet, Aurgazinsky District, Republic of Bashkortostan
Chulpan, Urshaksky Selsoviet, Aurgazinsky District, Republic of Bashkortostan
Chulpan, Yanaulsky District, Republic of Bashkortostan
Chulpan, Yermekeyevsky District, Republic of Bashkortostan

Other
Chulpan Khamatova (born 1975), Russian actress of Tatar origin

See also
 Cholpon (disambiguation)